Mikhail Rustamovich Kozakov (in some sources erroneously spelled Kazakov; born May 28, 1972, in Lviv) is a Ukrainian chess player. He was awarded the title Grandmaster (GM) in 2001 by the FIDE.

Biography and career 
Kazakov studied at the Lviv State University of Physical Culture's chess department, and graduated with a Master's degree in 1993. He obtained the title of International Master in 1996 from the FIDE, ad Grand Mater in 2001. He is also a chess coach, and organized various chess tournaments.

In 2002, he participated in the European Chess Clubs Cup, as part of the Lviv-base Karpaty-Galicia Club. He participated several times in the French Chess Championship; in 1999 for Le Mans Chess Club, then in 2008, 2009 and 2014 for the Bois-Colombes Chess Club. In 2015, Kozakov was Serbian Second League Champion.

References 

Living people
1972 births
Chess grandmasters
Ukrainian chess players